The Secretary General of the Confederación Nacional del Trabajo is the head of the Confederación Nacional del Trabajo (National Confederation of Labor; CNT), a Spanish confederation of anarcho-syndicalist labor unions. The position is elected by a congress or plenary session of the confederation. The position's powers are limited to technical and administrative affairs.

Since the confederation does not have fixed headquarters, the elected Secretary General's local federation becomes the confederation's central operations and a local plenary session of the local federation chooses the secretariats for other leadership positions. Together they are known as the Secretariado Permanente del Comité Confederal (Permanent Secretariat of the Confederal Committee, or SPCC). They, together with other regional federation's secretaries general, form the full Confederal Committee. The first general secretary of the CNT, chosen at its 1910 constitutional congress, was José Negre. He had been secretary general of Solidaridad Obrera, a Catalan union and precursor to the CNT. Thus Barcelona was the first headquarters. 

The CNT operated clandestinely during years of repression and splintered. Sources support several timelines of CNT Secretaries General during this time.

Through the Civil War (1910–1939) 

 1. Between 1911 and 1914 the organization was in hiding, in such a way that it cannot be guaranteed that José Negre actually held the position between 1913 and 1914. 
2. Provisionally replaced by Manuel Buenacasa between August and November 1917. 
3. Some consider that the term in office of Juan Peiró ended at the end of 1922 and that from that date to March 1923 the general secretariat was held by Salvador Seguí. 
4. Some versions say that Manuel Adame could have been Secretary General before Paulino Díez and that Pedro Vallina could replace him. 
5. His first surname also appears as García and Gracia. 
6. Some sources consider that the SP CN had already established itself in Zaragoza by the end of 1922. 
7. At this time it is unknown if there was a general secretary, although the possibility of Ángel Pestaña occupying the position and the SPCN return to Barcelona. 
8. Occasionally replaced by Manuel Sirvent according to some sources and by Francisco Martínez according to others. 
9. According to M. Pérez until June 1932. 
10. Some sources place Joaquín Ascaso immediately before, until December 1933. 
11. It seems that he resigned after the Zaragoza congress of 1936 and that he was provisionally replaced by David Antona and Antonio Moreno in Madrid throughout the summer, returning to the general secretariat between September and mid-November.

During Franco (1939–1976) 

During this period, the CNT worked clandestinely both inside Spain and in French exile. A schism among the exiles created two confederal committees with their own corresponding secretaries general.

In Spain

In exile 

 1. After his death, Germinal Esgleas Jaume took over.

Orthodox faction 

 1.He resigned in December 1948.

Possibilist faction

Reunification of exiled factions 

 1. He resigned in January 1975.

Since the transition to democracy (1976–present) 

 
Confederación Nacional del Trabajo